The biathlon competition at the 1994 Winter Olympics were held at the Birkebeineren Ski Stadium. The events were held between 18 and 26 February 1994.

The sport of biathlon combines the skills of cross-country skiing and rifle shooting. Men and women competed in three events. The biathlon program remained unchanged except for the women's relay distance from 3 x 7.5 km to 4 x 7.5 km.

Medal summary

Six nations won medals in biathlon, with Russia leading the medal table (3 gold, 1 silver, 1 bronze), and Germany winning the most total medals with six. Sergei Tarasov was the only individual to win three medals, while Myriam Bédard led the individual medal table with two gold medals.

Bédard's pair of gold medals were the first won an athlete from outside Europe or the Soviet Union. In addition, Valentina Tserbe-Nessina became the first Olympic medalist from Ukraine, and Svetlana Paramygina became the first female Olympic medalist from Belarus, as those countries made their Olympic debuts.

Medal table

Men's events

Women's events

Participating nations
Thirty-two nations sent biathletes to compete in the events. Below is a list of the competing nations; in parentheses are the number of national competitors.

See also 
Biathlon at the 1994 Winter Paralympics

References 

 
1994 in biathlon
1994 Winter Olympics events
1994
Biathlon competitions in Norway